In biochemistry and molecular biology, saline-sodium citrate (SSC) buffer is used as a hybridization buffer, to control stringency for washing steps in protocols for Southern blotting, in situ hybridization, DNA Microarray or Northern blotting. 20X SSC may be used to prevent drying of agarose gels during a vacuum transfer. 

A 20X stock solution consists of 3 M sodium chloride and 300 mM trisodium citrate (adjusted to pH 7.0 with HCl).

See also
Southern Blot
Northern Blot
DNA Microarray
DNA Fingerprinting

References
 Material safety data sheet for 20x SSC buffer, Mediatech, Inc.
 Molecular Cytogenetics and biology Buffers, University of Leicester

Buffer solutions